Chris Gadi N'Kiasala (born 9 April 1992) is a French professional footballer. He plays for Olympic Charleroi as a winger, is equally comfortable playing on both right and the left winger positions.

Career

Septemvri Sofia
On 18 June 2017, Gadi signed with the newly promoted to Bulgarian First League team of Septemvri Sofia, coming from Spartak Pleven. He made his debut for the team in the second round of the league during a win against Pirin Blagoevgrad.

Olympic Charleroi
In August 2020 he joined Belgian First Amateur Division club Olympic Charleroi.

Career statistics

Club

International career
Gadi is a France youth international having represented his nation at under-17 and under-18 level. He played with the under-17 team at the 2009 UEFA European Under-17 Football Championship. Gadi made his professional debut on 17 December 2011 in a 2–1 win over Lorient appearing as a substitute. His father is a fan of Marseille and, subsequently, named his son after former Marseille player and England international Chris Waddle.

Honours
Marseille
Trophée des Champions: 2011

References

External links 
 Club Profile
 
 
 

Living people
1992 births
People from Ris-Orangis
Association football wingers
French footballers
French expatriate footballers
France youth international footballers
French sportspeople of Democratic Republic of the Congo descent
ES Viry-Châtillon players
Olympique de Marseille players
US Boulogne players
PFC Lokomotiv Plovdiv players
PFC Beroe Stara Zagora players
PFC Spartak Pleven players
FC Septemvri Sofia players
Petrojet SC players
SFC Etar Veliko Tarnovo players
Al-Mujazzal Club players
Ligue 1 players
First Professional Football League (Bulgaria) players
Egyptian Premier League players
Saudi First Division League players
Expatriate footballers in Bulgaria
French expatriate sportspeople in Bulgaria
Expatriate footballers in Egypt
French expatriate sportspeople in Egypt
Expatriate footballers in Saudi Arabia
French expatriate sportspeople in Saudi Arabia
Expatriate footballers in Belgium
French expatriate sportspeople in Belgium
Footballers from Essonne
ESA Linas-Montlhéry players
Black French sportspeople